The Sheriff of Kincardine, also known as The Mearns, was historically a royal appointment, held at pleasure, which carried the responsibility for enforcing justice in Kincardine, Scotland. Prior to 1748 most sheriffdoms were held on a hereditary basis. From that date, following the Jacobite uprising of 1745, the hereditary sheriffs were replaced by salaried sheriff-deputes, qualified advocates who were members of the Scottish Bar.

Following a general merger of the sheriffdoms in 1870 the position became the Sheriff of Aberdeen and Kincardine.

Sheriffs

 Osbert Olifard (c. 1160)
 John de Hastinkes, Lord of Dun (1163-1178)
 Robert de Inverkeilor (c. 1198)
 Robert Senescald (1214-1225)
 Philip de Melville, Lord of Mondynes (1222-1240)
 John Wishart (1230)
 Reginald le Chen (1263)
 Robert le Chen (1263-1266)
 Reginald le Chen (1266)
 Reginald le Chen (1290)
 Alexander de Abernethy (1305)
 Richard de Dummor (1305)
 Alexander de Stratoun, Lord of Lauriston (1328) 
 Alexander Fraser (1330)
 Simon Fraser (1337)
 Robert de Keith (1348-1358)
 William de Keith (1359-1391)
Robert Burnard - Deputy (1391)
 Robert de Keith, Lord of Troup (1406-1407)
 William Keith (1442)
Alexander Ogilvy of Inverquharity - Deputy (1443)
Patrick Barclay - Deputy (1448)
 John de Melville of Glenbervie (1420)
 William Keith, 1st Earl Marischal (1470)
 William Keith, 2nd Earl Marischal (1483)
 William Keith, 3rd Earl Marischal (1492)
 William Keith, 4th Earl Marischal (1525)
 William Keith, Lord Keith (1621)

Sheriffs-Depute

 Arthur Sheppard, 1728–1748? 
 Francis Garden, Lord Gardenstone, 1748–1760? 
 James Burnet, 1760–1767? 
 Walter Campbell of Shawfield, 1767–1777
 John Scott, 1777–1780? 
 John Ramsay, 1780–1783 
 Alexander Gordon, 1784–1806? 
 Adam Gillies, 1806–1811 
 George Douglas, 1812–1847? 
 Archibald Davidson, 1847–1848 (Sheriff of Aberdeen, 1848) 
 John Cowan, 1848–1851 
 John Montgomerie Bell, 1852–1862  
 Alexander Burns Shand, 1862–1869   (Sheriff of Haddington and Berwick, 1869-1872}

For sheriffs after 1870 see Sheriff of Aberdeen and Kincardine.

See also
 Historical development of Scottish sheriffdoms

Citations

References
 

Sheriff courts
Aberdeenshire

1870 disestablishments in Scotland